Svyatik Artemenko (born February 11, 2000) is a Canadian soccer player who plays for Electric City FC in League1 Ontario.

Early life
Artemenko was born in Odesa, Ukraine. At the age of two, he moved with his family to Winnipeg, Canada. He played youth soccer with Bonivital SC and represented Manitoba at the 2017 Canada Summer Games.

University career
In 2021, he began attending Guelph University, where he played for the men's soccer team. He was named the team Rookie of the Year in 2021.

Club career
In 2019, he played with WSA Winnipeg in USL League Two. Also in 2019, he signed with Valour FC of the Canadian Premier League as an emergency backup goalkeeper, but did not appear in any matches. He attended training camp the following years with Valour, but did not earn a contract.

In 2021, he joined Guelph United F.C. in League1 Ontario. He was named a West Division All-Star and West Division Top Goalkeeper. In the playoff semi-final, Artemenko scored the winning penalty kick, before making the winning save in a penalty shootout against Master's FA to advance to the next round, where Guelph won the championship defeating Blue Devils FC.

In early 2022, he went to Ukraine to trial to earn a professional contract with FC Podillya in the second tier Ukrainian First League, earning a contract on February 23. However, the next day, Russia invaded Ukraine suspending all soccer activities in the country and Artemenko registered for the Ukrainian army.

On May 5, 2022, following his military service in Ukraine, he returned to Guelph United to re-join them for their 2022 season. He made his return in a Canadian Championship match against Canadian Premier League club HFX Wanderers FC. In August 2022, he joined Canadian Premier League side York United FC as an emergency goalkeeper substitute for a few matches following an injury to Niko Giantsopoulos.

In August 2022, he joined FC Berlin of the United Premier Soccer League ahead of the 2022 UPSL Fall season.

In March 2023, he joined Electric City FC in League1 Ontario.

Military career
Between the ages of 16 and 18, Artemenko trained as a combat engineer with the Canadian Reserve Forces in Winnipeg.

In February 2022, Artemenko, who was in Ukraine pursuing a professional soccer career, enlisted with the Armed Forces of Ukraine following the 2022 Russian invasion of Ukraine. While he was not required to enlist in the army as he was a Canadian citizen, he felt it was his duty to protect his ancestral homeland. He was initially not allowed to join due to not being a Ukrainian citizen, however, the next day his application was approved as part of an International Legion. His club team, Guelph United hosted a fundraiser to raise funds for the Ukrainian Red Cross in support of Artemenko's cause. He returned to Canada in early May, following a two-month tour of duty.

Career statistics

References

External links

2000 births
Living people
Association football goalkeepers
Canadian soccer players
Ukrainian footballers
USL League Two players
League1 Ontario players
United Premier Soccer League players
Guelph Gryphons men's soccer players
FC Manitoba players
Guelph United F.C. players
Valour FC players
York United FC players
FC Berlin (Canada/United States) players
Ukrainian military personnel of the 2022 Russian invasion of Ukraine